In economic and environmental fields, decoupling refers to an economy that would be able to grow without corresponding increases in environmental pressure. In many economies, increasing production (GDP) currently raises pressure on the environment. An economy that would be able to sustain economic growth while reducing the amount of resources such as water or fossil fuels used and delink environmental deterioration at the same time would be said to be decoupled. Environmental pressure is often measured using emissions of pollutants, and decoupling is often measured by the emission intensity of economic output. Examples of absolute long-term decoupling are rare, but recently some industrialized countries have decoupled GDP growth from both production- and, to a lesser extent, consumption-based  emissions. 

In countries and economic markets where decoupling may be identified, one explanation could be the transition to a service economy. This hypothesis has been expanded upon by the Environmental Kuznets curve.

In 2002, the OECD defined the term as follows:
the term 'decoupling' refers to breaking the link between "environmental bads" and "economic goods." It explains this as having rates of increasing wealth greater than the rates of increasing impacts.

Importance of the issue of decoupling 
Historically there has been a close correlation between economic growth and environmental degradation: as communities grow in size and prosperity, so the environment declines. This trend is clearly demonstrated on graphs of human population numbers, economic growth, and environmental indicators. There is a concern that, unless resource use is checked, modern global civilization will follow the path of ancient civilizations that collapsed through overexploitation of their resource base. While conventional economics is concerned largely with economic growth and the efficient allocation of resources, ecological economics has the explicit goal of sustainable scale (rather than continual growth), fair distribution and efficient allocation, in that order. The World Business Council for Sustainable Development states that "business cannot succeed in societies that fail."

In economic and environmental fields, the term decoupling is becoming increasingly used in the context of economic production and environmental quality. When used in this way, it refers to the ability of an economy to grow without incurring corresponding increases in environmental pressure. Ecological economics includes the study of societal metabolism, the throughput of resources that enter and exit the economic system in relation to environmental quality. An economy that can sustain GDP growth without harming the environment is said to be decoupled. Exactly how, if, or to what extent this can be achieved is a subject of much debate.

In 2011 the International Resource Panel, hosted by the United Nations Environment Programme (UNEP), warned that by 2050 the human race could be devouring 140 billion tons of minerals, ores, fossil fuels and biomass per year—three times its current rate of consumption—unless nations can make serious attempts at decoupling. The report noted that citizens of developed countries consume an average of 16 tons of those four key resources per capita per annum (ranging up to 40 or more tons per person in some developed countries). By comparison, the average person in India today consumes four tons per year.

Sustainability studies analyse ways to reduce resource intensity (the amount of resource (e.g. water, energy, or materials) needed for the production, consumption and disposal of a unit of good or service) whether this be achieved from improved economic management, product design, or new technology.

There are conflicting views on whether improvements in technological efficiency and innovation will enable a complete decoupling of economic growth from environmental degradation. On the one hand, it has been claimed repeatedly by efficiency experts that resource use intensity (i.e., energy and materials use per unit GDP) could in principle be reduced by at least four or five-fold, thereby allowing for continued economic growth without increasing resource depletion and associated pollution. On the other hand, an extensive historical analysis of technological efficiency improvements has conclusively shown that improvements in the efficiency of the use of energy and materials were almost always outpaced by economic growth, in large part because of the rebound effect (conservation) or Jevons Paradox resulting in a net increase in resource use and associated pollution. Furthermore, there are inherent thermodynamic (i.e., second law of thermodynamics) and practical limits to all efficiency improvements. For example, there are certain minimum unavoidable material requirements for growing food, and there are limits to making automobiles, houses, furniture, and other products lighter and thinner without the risk of losing their necessary functions. Since it is both theoretically and practically impossible to increase resource use efficiencies indefinitely, it is equally impossible to have continued and infinite economic growth without a concomitant increase in resource depletion and environmental pollution, i.e., economic growth and resource depletion can be decoupled to some degree over the short run but not the long run. Consequently, long-term sustainability requires the transition to a steady state economy in which total GDP remains more or less constant, as has been advocated for decades by Herman Daly and others in the ecological economics community.

The OECD 2019 Report "Environment at a Glance Indicators – Climate change" points out that the issue of diminishing GHG emissions while maintaining GDP growth is a major challenge for the forthcoming years.

Policies 
Policies have been proposed for creating the conditions that enable widespread investments in resource productivity. According to Mark Patton a global leading expert, Such potential policies include the raising of resource prices in line with increases in energy or resource productivity, a shift in revenue-raising onto resource prices through resource taxation at source or in relation to product imports, with recycling of revenues back to the economy, ...

Technologies 
Several technologies have been described in the Decoupling 2 report, including:
 Technologies to save energy (technologies directly reducing fossil fuel consumption, saving electricity in industry, reducing fossil-fuel demand in transportation, ...)
 Technologies saving metals and minerals (technologies reducing metal use, saving materials from waste streams, ...)
 Technologies saving freshwater and biotic resources (technologies saving freshwater extraction, protecting soil fertility, saving biotic resources, ...)

Documentation 
In 2014, the same International Resource Panel published a second report, "Decoupling 2", which "highlights existing technological possibilities and opportunities for both developing and developed countries to accelerate decoupling and reap the environmental and economic benefits of increased resource productivity." The lead coordinating author of this report was Ernst Ulrich von Weizsäcker.

In 2016, the International Resource Panel published a report indicating that "global material productivity has declined since about the year 2000 and the global economy now needs more materials per unit of GDP than it did at the turn of the century" as a result of shifts in production from high-income to middle-income countries. That is to say, the growth of material flows has been stronger than the growth of gross domestic product. This is the opposite of decoupling, a situation that some people call overcoupling.

Terminology

Relative and absolute decoupling 
Tim Jackson, author of Prosperity Without Growth, stresses the importance of differentiating between relative and absolute decoupling:

 Relative decoupling refers to a decline in the ecological intensity per unit of economic output. In this situation, resource impacts decline relative to the GDP, which could itself still be rising.
 Absolute decoupling refers to a situation in which resource impacts decline in absolute terms. Resource efficiencies must increase at least as fast as economic output does and must continue to improve as the economy grows, if absolute decoupling is to occur.

Jackson points out that an economy can correctly claim that it has relatively decoupled its economy in terms of energy inputs per unit of GDP. However, in this situation, total environmental impacts would still be increasing, albeit at a slower pace of growth than in GDP.

Jackson uses this distinction to caution against technology-optimists who use the term decoupling as an "escape route from the dilemma of growth." He points out that "there is quite a lot of evidence to support the existence of [relative decoupling]" in global economies, however "evidence for [absolute decoupling] is harder to find."

Similarly, ecological economist and steady-state theorist Herman Daly stated in 1991:

Between 1990 and 2015, the carbon intensity per $GDP declined of 0.6 percent per year (relative decoupling), but the population grew of 1.3 percent per year and the income per capita also grew of 1.3 percent per year. That is to say, the carbon emissions grew of 1.3 + 1.3 − 0.6 = 2 percent per year, leading to a 62% increase in 25 years (the data reflect no absolute decoupling). According to Tim Jackson:

On economic growth and environmental degradation, Donella Meadows wrote:

Resource and impact decoupling 
Resource decoupling refers to reducing the rate of resource use per unit of economic activity. The "dematerialization" is based on using less material, energy, water and land resources for the same economic input. Impact decoupling required increasing economic output while reducing negative environmental impacts. These impacts arise from the extraction of resources.

Lack of evidence for decoupling 

There is no empirical evidence supporting the existence of an eco-economic decoupling near the scale needed to avoid environmental degradation, and it is unlikely to happen in the future. Environmental pressures can only be reduced by rethinking green growth policies, where a sufficiency approach complements greater efficiency.

According to scientist and author Vaclav Smil, "Without a biosphere in a good shape, there is no life on the planet. It’s very simple. That’s all you need to know. The economists will tell you we can decouple growth from material consumption, but that is total nonsense. The options are quite clear from the historical evidence. If you don’t manage decline, then you succumb to it and you are gone. The best hope is that you find some way to manage it."

In 2020, a meta-analysis of 180 scientific studies notes that there is "No evidence of the kind of decoupling needed for ecological sustainability" and that "in the absence of robust evidence, the goal of decoupling rests partly on faith".

See also
 Eco-innovation
 Energy conservation
 Economics of climate change mitigation
 Green growth
 Jevons paradox
 Kaya identity
 Rebound effect (conservation)
 Steady-state economy
 Sustainability

Notes and references

Works cited

External links 
 2015 article by George Monbiot

Environmental economics